The Chinese Elm cultivar Ulmus parvifolia 'Milliken' is another American introduction.

Description
The tree grows to about 14 m in height, with a spread of slightly smaller dimension. Bearing dark-green leaves, and sporting the usual mottled bark, 'Milliken' is particularly noted for its uniform shape .

Pests and diseases
The species and its cultivars are highly resistant, but not immune, to Dutch elm disease, and unaffected by the Elm Leaf Beetle Xanthogaleruca luteola.

Cultivation
'Milliken' is not known to be in cultivation beyond North America.

Etymology
Named for the Milliken Arboretum, owned by the Milliken & Company floor coverings manufacturer.

Accessions

North America

Milliken Arboretum, Spartanburg, South Carolina, US. No details available.

References

External links
http://www.ces.ncsu.edu/depts/hort/consumer/factsheets/trees-new/cultivars/ulmus_parvifolia.htm Ulmus parvifolia cultivar list.

Chinese elm cultivar
Ulmus articles missing images
Ulmus